Central District of Taftan County is a district (bakhsh) in Taftan County, Sistan and Baluchestan province, Iran. At the 2006 census, its population was 38,372, in 8,436 families.  The district has one city: Nukabad. The district has four rural districts (dehestan): Eskelabad Rural District, Gowhar Kuh Rural District, Nazil Rural District, and Taftan-e Jonubi Rural District.

References 

Khash County
Districts of Sistan and Baluchestan Province